Kendall Mayfield (born May 11, 1948) is an American former professional basketball player who played for the New York Knicks of the National Basketball Association (NBA).

Career
Mayfield was drafted in the 3rd round (50th overall) of the 1971 NBA draft by the New York Knicks.
He signed with the team in June but was cut in October before the season.
He rejoined the Knicks during the 1972 offseason but was again cut before the season.
He was again cut from the Knicks' preseason roster in October 1974.

In between his short stints with the Knicks, he mostly played in the Eastern Basketball Association for teams like the Allentown Jets.
He also had a stint in the European Professional Basketball League for the Belgium Lions in early 1975.

Mayfield finally played for the Knicks during the 1974–75 NBA season. He appeared in 13 games for 2.8 points per game before being released in November 1975.

References

External links
Real GM profile Retrieved on 19 November 2017

1948 births
Living people
American men's basketball players
Coffeyville Red Ravens men's basketball players
New York Knicks draft picks
New York Knicks players
Shooting guards
Tuskegee Golden Tigers men's basketball players
Basketball players from Chicago